A shark sanctuary is an area that forbids commercial fishing operations from targeting and retaining caught sharks, including their fins. The first shark sanctuary was created by Palau in 2009. It was followed by Maldives, Honduras, The Bahamas and Tokelau.

Background

Every year, fishermen pull "up to 73 million" or "some 100 million" sharks from the world's oceans. The United Nations Food and Agriculture Organization (FAO) estimates that more than half of shark species are overexploited or depleted. Globally, 21% of shark species whose extinction risk has been assessed fall into the "threatened" categories, and 18% are "near threatened", while 35% lack sufficient data to decide, leaving 26% in the unthreatened category.

The search for shark fins drives the illegal hunting trade. Some jurisdictions permit fishing for fins and food. Sharks are also caught as bycatch when fishing for marlin, tuna and other varieties.

Sharks generally reach sexual maturity only after several years of life and produce very few offspring in comparison to other harvested fish. Harvesting sharks before they reproduce has severe impacts on future populations.

National and international status
Many nations restrict shark catches and shark finning.

Pacific Islands
Palau created the world's first so-named "shark sanctuary" on September 25, 2009. Palau forbids all commercial shark fishing within its Exclusive Economic Zone (EEZ) waters. President Johnson Toribiong made the announcement at a meeting of the United Nations. President Toribiong also requested a worldwide ban on shark fishing. Palau is home to 135 endangered or vulnerable shark and ray species.

The Maldives created a sanctuary in March, 2010. Tokelau declared its entire EEZ a shark sanctuary in 2011.

On February 25, 2011, Guam, a US island territory, voted to ban commerce in fins. Guam's Senate passed a bill banning the sale, possession and distribution of the fins.

Kiribati, another Pacific island state, and the US operate Earth's largest marine reserve.

Americas

Honduras prohibited the taking of sharks in its national waters as of February 2010.

The U.S. bans shark finning on all U.S.-flagged vessels, forbids the taking 19 species of sharks including white, whale, and basking sharks and shares lists of illegal vessels with established fishing companies, helping them report illegal activities. The U.S. also assesses the health of many of its shark populations and includes sharks in its various Fishery Management Plans. Hawaii has banned the sale and possession of shark fins. The states of California, Oregon and Washington are considering similar bans.

Africa
In 1991 South Africa became the first country in the world to declare great white sharks a legally protected species.

Europe
In February 2009, the European Commission proposed first-ever shark conservation rules for European waters, although these are not outright bans. EU countries account for one-third of global shark meat exports.

Shark steaks are increasingly served in restaurants. Shark parts are also used in lotions and leather sports shoes.

Asia
Taiwan banned shark finning in 2012.

Shark fishery

After reaching about 0.9 million tonnes in 2003, catches of the “sharks, rays and chimaeras” group declined to 0.75 million tonnes in 2006, a drop of 15 percent., numbering some 100 million fish.

Drivers of the shark trade

Sharks are a common seafood in many places around the world, including China (shark-fin soup), Japan, Australia (fish and chips under the name flake), in India (under the name sora in Tamil language and Telugu language), and Icelanders eat Greenland sharks as hákarl.

The practice of live finning, where a fisherman removes the fin with a hot metal blade and releases the dying animal occurs with some frequency, but is  not a prevalent practice, with most fins taken with the entire animal. Around 80% of shark fins are derived as accidental by-catch, which are quickly sold to the market due to their high price. Shark finning has become a major trade within black markets all over the world with shark fins going at about $300/lb in 2009.

European consumers consume dogfishes, smoothhounds, catsharks, makos, porbeagle and also skates and rays. However, the U.S. FDA recommends that children and women who are or may be pregnant should refrain from eating shark.
For details see mercury in fish.

In the East Asian region, use of shark cartilage in preparing soups is considered a health tonic. Hong Kong imports it from North and South American countries, particularly for use in either a cooked format or to prepare boiled soup, as a health fad, by mixing it with herbals supplements.

Another large demand for shark cartilage is for manufacture of "Shark Cartilage Powder" or pills as a cure for cancer. The anti cancer claims of such powders marketed in many parts of the world has been discounted by the US Food and Drug Administration, Federal Trade Commissions and medical studies. In spite of such injunctions, the trade in this powder continues and the shark cartilage powder is still widely marketed as a cancer cure, stated to be selling at US$145 per gram. It is also stated that in Costa Rica, one single firm alone processed 235,000 sharks every month to manufacture cartilage pills.

Seafood Watch recommends that everyone avoid eating shark.

The majority of shark fisheries around the globe have little monitoring or management. With the rise in demand for shark products there is a greater pressure on fisheries. Sharks experience a long interval between birth and sexual maturity, such that many sharks never reach maturity. In some species, populations have declined by over 90% over the past 20–30 years with decline of 70% not unusual.

The practice of shark finning, attracts much controversy and regulations are being enacted to prevent it from occurring. The acclaimed 2007 documentary, Sharkwater exposed how sharks are being hunted to extinction, in part due to the massive Asian demand for shark fin soup.

See also
Grey nurse shark conservation
Shark Conservation Act
Sharkwater

References

Sharks
Fisheries science
Marine reserves
Marine conservation